Airmen Training Institute (ATI) is a training and education institution which provides basic and advance training to all men and women who are preparing to be airmens in the Bangladesh Air Force. The Airmen Training Institution is located in the district town of Chattogram at Air Force Base Zahurul Haque. An air officer (e.g. an Air Commodore) serves as its Commandant.

References

Military aviation
Aviation by country
Air Training Corps